Husted is a surname. Notable people with the surname include:

Bill Husted (1866–1941), American baseball player
Dave Husted (born 1960), American ten-pin bowler
Erik Husted (1900–1988), Danish field hockey player
Ida Husted Harper (1851-1931), American suffragist, journalist, author
James Husted (disambiguation), multiple people
Jon A. Husted (born 1967), American politician
Marjorie Husted (1892–1986), American home economist
Michael Husted (born 1970), American football player
Otto Husted (1902–1980), Danish field hockey player
Per Husted (born 1966), Danish politician